Ross J. Baldessarini (born 1937, Western Massachusetts), a psychopharmacologist, is the Director, International Consortium for Bipolar & Psychotic Disorders Research at McLean Hospital and Professor of Psychiatry (Neuroscience) at Harvard Medical School.

Education
1959 AB in Chemistry, Williams College
1963 MD, Johns Hopkins University School of Medicine

Publications

Books
Chemotherapy in Psychiatry: Pharmacologic Basis of Treatments for Major Mental Illness

Selected journal articles

Vázquez GH, Tondo L, Undurraga J, Baldessarini RJ. Overview of antidepressant treatment of bipolar depression. International Journal of Neuropsychopharmacology 2013;16(7):1673-1685.

Yildiz A, Vieta E, Nikodem M, Correll CU, Baldessarini RJ. A network meta-analysis on comparative efficacy and all-cause discontinuation of antimanic treatments in acute bipolar mania. Psychological Medicine 2014;1–19.

Schalkwijk S, Undurraga J, Tondo L, Baldessarini RJ. Declining efficacy in controlled trials of antidepressants: effects of placebo dropout. International Journal of Neuropsychopharmacology 2014;17(8):1343-1352.

References

External links
Ross J. Baldessarini, D.Sc., M.D. at Harvard Catalyst

McLean Hospital physicians
Williams College alumni
Johns Hopkins School of Medicine alumni
Psychopharmacologists
Bipolar disorder researchers
Johns Hopkins University alumni